Graeme Atkinson (born 11 November 1971) is an English former professional footballer who normally played as a midfielder.

On 4 July 2008, Atkinson was confirmed as a scout of newly promoted Conference National side Barrow.

In January 2016, Atkinson returned to Preston North End at the club's community department, leading on the Post-16 education provision.

References

External links

Graeme Atkinson career stats at OnCloudSeven.com

1971 births
Living people
English footballers
Hull City A.F.C. players
Preston North End F.C. players
Rochdale A.F.C. players
Brighton & Hove Albion F.C. players
Scunthorpe United F.C. players
Lancaster City F.C. players
Scarborough F.C. players
Tamworth F.C. players
Association football midfielders
Footballers from Kingston upon Hull
English Football League players
Spennymoor United F.C. players
Southport F.C. players